Engina trifasciata, is commonly known as the "striped engina" or "bumble bee snail", names which can also refer to Engina mendicaria.  It is a species of small sea snail, a marine gastropod mollusk in the family Pisaniidae.

Description
Engina trifasciata can reach 17 mm in size. The shell is striped in a transverse spiral pattern with alternating bands of black and cream.

References

Pisaniidae
Gastropods described in 1846